Mosagallaku Mosagadu may refer to:

 Mosagallaku Mosagadu (1971 film)
 Mosagallaku Mosagadu (2015 film)

See also 
 Monagallaku Monagadu, a 1966 film
Mosagallu, a 2021 film